Mount Meeker is a high mountain summit of the Twin Peaks Massif in the northern Front Range of the Rocky Mountains of North America.

Mountain
Mount Meeker is the second highest summit in Rocky Mountain National Park after its neighbor Longs Peak,  to the northwest.  Due to its location southeast of Longs Peak, Mount Meeker is more visually prominent along much of the northern Front Range Urban Corridor.  The peak is considered more difficult to climb, technically, than Longs Peak on certain routes.

Historical names

 ("two ears") is what a couple of French trappers called Longs Peak and Mount Meeker in 1799.

The name "Mount Meeker" was first suggested in 1873 when the Hayden Survey was performed. Present were William Byers, Anna Dickinson, and Ralph Meeker, the son of Nathan Meeker. It was officially named this in 1911.

Gallery

See also

List of Colorado mountain ranges
List of Colorado mountain summits
List of Colorado fourteeners
List of Colorado 4000 meter prominent summits
List of the most prominent summits of Colorado
List of Colorado county high points

References

External links

SummitPost on climbing Meeker

Meeker
Meeker
Meeker